The Gifford School is a special education school located on Route 20, in Weston, Massachusetts. In total, it has approximately 100 students. The school takes students ages 8 and up, and is separated into a lower school (elementary school), a middle school, and a high school departments, each with their own principal, social worker, and head teacher.

Campus 
The Gifford School's campus consists of an administration building, a high school building, a middle school and lower school building, The Fenn Center, a woodshop building and a woodshed. The Fenn Center consists of the science room, computer lab, gymnasium with a stage, nurse's office, and Multi Media Arts Studio. The gymnasium is also used as an auditorium and lunch room.

Fire 
On Wednesday, December 23, 2009, at 6:04 am, The Fenn Center was involved in a 4-Alarm fire and was severely damaged. The fire was determined to be accidental. Backup was called in from the surrounding towns of Lexington, Waltham, Natick, Newton, Sudbury, and Wellesley. The fire caused Route 20 and the on-ramp to Route 128 to be closed during the morning commute.

References

External links 
 The Gifford School

Special schools in the United States
Schools in Middlesex County, Massachusetts
Weston, Massachusetts